Cabezas, also known as San Antonio de Cabezas, is a Cuban village and consejo popular ("people's council", i.e. hamlet) of the municipality of Unión de Reyes, in Matanzas Province. Sometimes referred to as Wajay, it has a population of 5,549 and the council's administrative territory covers an area of 28.70 km².

History
The village was founded in 1822 around the church of San Antonio, and its population increased from 1827. Before the administrative reform of 1976, it was an autonomous municipality that included the villages of Bermeja, Bija, Lima and Magdalena.

Geography
Located at the borders between the provinces of Matanzas and Mayabeque, Cabezas spans on a plain north of the Zapata Swamp. It is 6 km far from Bermeja, 8 from Palos, 14 from Nueva Paz, 20 from Unión de Reyes, 37 from Matanzas and 88 from Havana.

Transport
The village is crossed in the middle by the Circuito Sur highway (CS) and nearest station, Palos (on the Havana-Güines-Cienfuegos railway), is 8 km southwest. Nearest motorway exit, "Nueva Paz" (on the A1 motorway), is 14 km southwest.

See also
Municipalities of Cuba
List of cities in Cuba

References

External links

Populated places in Matanzas Province
Populated places established in 1822
1822 establishments in Cuba